Pristiterebra bifrons is a species of sea snail, a marine gastropod mollusk in the family Terebridae, the auger snails.

Description

Distribution

References

 Terryn, Y. (2007). Terebridae: A Collectors Guide. Conchbooks & Natural Art. 59pp + plates
 Terryn Y. & Fraussen K. (2019). A new species of Duplicaria from NW South Korea. Gloria Maris. 57(4): 130-133-page(s): 131, pl. 1 fig. 8

External links
 Hinds R.B. (1844 ["1843"]). Descriptions of new shells, collected during the voyage of the Sulphur, and in Mr. Cuming's late visit to the Philippines. Proceedings of the Zoological Society of London. 11: 149–159.

Terebridae
Gastropods described in 1844